Kuh Par (also Romanized as Kūh Par) is a village in Kelardasht-e Sharqi Rural District, Kelardasht District, Chalus County, Mazandaran Province, Iran. At the 2006 census, its population was 229, in 57 families.

References 

Populated places in Chalus County